The Gasparilla Distance Classic is a road race which is held in late February or early March on Bayshore Boulevard in Tampa, Florida. Over 30,000 competitors participate each year. It is named after the Gasparilla Pirate Festival, which takes place on Tampa's Bayshore Boulevard a few weeks earlier.

History
The Gasparilla Distance Classic Association was established in 1978 dedicated specifically to raising funds for charitable youth organizations and running programs in the Tampa Bay area.  Its mission is carried out through the administration of the annual Publix Super Markets Gasparilla Distance Classic Race Weekend and Jr. Gasparilla Distance Classic. Since the first running of the Gasparilla Distance Classic in February 1978, $5.9 million has been donated to the Boys & Girls Clubs of Tampa, Girls Inc. of Pinellas, The Friends of Tampa Parks & Recreation and other running programs.  More than 485,000+ runners and walkers have crossed the finish line. 

The race weekend includes the Half Marathon, 8k, the Publix Super Markets Gasparilla Distance Classic 15K & 5K, Kellogg's 5K Walk, Fifth Third Bank Half Marathon Team Challenge & Stroller Roll, Michelob Ultra Challenge (15K, 5K, Half Marathon & 8K) and the Beck's Light Challenge (15K, 5K & Half Marathon) 

The Gasparilla Distance Classic used to include a marathon race (26.2 miles). The final marathon was in 2010 and titled the "Final Voyage".
Wilson Chepkwony of Kenya was the Men’s 2010 Marathon Champion with a time of 2:24:48 and Melissa Gacek of St. Paul, Minn was the Women’s 2010 Marathon Champion with a time of 2:53:20

Human interest stories

In 2008 Iraq war veteran Ivan Castro ran  of the Gasparilla Classic only 17 months after being blinded by shrapnel on a rooftop in Baghdad.   

Sam had originally planned to run in the marathon in Tampa, but was deployed one month before the race. He was given the Ok by race officials to run a course on base in Afghanistan, but was forced onto a treadmill after heavy rains ruined the outdoor track.

Charity

The Challenged Athletes Foundation(CAF) sponsors the LabCorp Elite 15K Wheelchair Division. CAF raises money to help people with physical disabilities pursue an active lifestyle through physical fitness and athletics. 

The Mendez Foundation Too Good For Drugs Junior Gasparilla Distance Classic is a free mini-marathon, now in its 20th year, for children ages 2 to 10. The race emphasizes participation over competition. Every child receives a race bib with the number "1" printed on it, as well as a goody bag, T-shirt and, after crossing the finish line, a competitor's medal.

2011 Charitable Organizations & Running Related Programs Supported By The Gasparilla Distance Classic Association, Inc. 

Boys and Girls Club of Tampa Bay 
Girls INC.
Friends of Tampa Recreation INC. 
St. Joseph's Hospital Foundation
Richard's Run
National Psoriasis Foundation
Because of Ezra
Wounded Warrior Foundation
Team Olivia 
Girls On The Run

Tampa Cross Country & Track Programs 

 University of Tampa 
 Bloomingdale High School  
 Chamberlain High School    
 Plant High School   
 Robinson High School  
 Sickles High School  
 Steinbrenner High School  
 Wharton High School 

YOUTH RUNNING PROGRAMS

 Fifth Third Bank Too Good For Drugs Jr. Gasparilla Distance Classic 
 Florida Blue Kids Running Program
 Tampa Police Memorial Run

Past 15K winners
Key:

References

List of winners
Gasparovic, Juraj & Leydig, Jack (2011-03-01). Gasparilla Distance Classic 15 km. Association of Road Racing Statisticians. Retrieved on 2011-10-23.

External links
Official website

Marathons in the United States
15K runs
Sports competitions in Tampa, Florida
Road running competitions in the United States
Recurring sporting events established in 1978
1978 establishments in Florida